Michael "MC" Cheung Tin-fu (born 1 December 1996), better known by his stage name MC, is a Hong Kong singer and actor. He rose to fame as the runner-up in the 2019 talent competition reality show King Maker II. He subsequently signed a record deal with Warner Music Hong Kong and made his debut with the single "Good Time" in 2021. He won various new artist awards, including 2021 Ultimate Song Chart Best Male Newcomer (Gold).

Early life and education 
Cheung was born in Hong Kong on 1 December 1996. At a young age, he emigrated to Canada to pursue studies, where he subsequently graduated.

Career 
Cheung gained prominence as a runner-up in the 2019 Hong Kong reality competition show, King Maker II (全民造星II). On 31 December 2020, Cheung joined Warner Music Hong Kong. He released his debut single "Good Time" on 30 March 2021. His single "Pillow Talk" peaked at number one on Billboard's Hong Kong Chart.

Discography

Studio Albums

Extended plays

Singles

Filmography

Television shows

Movies

MV Appearance (Actor)

Concerts

Concert participation

Awards

Music Awards

Notes

References

External links 
 
 MC on Youtube
 

1996 births
Living people
Hong Kong male singers
Canadian people of Chinese descent
Cantopop singers
English-language singers from Hong Kong
21st-century Hong Kong male singers
King Maker II contestants
Warner Music Hong Kong artists